is a Japanese football player.

Club statistics

References

External links

1986 births
Living people
Association football people from Miyagi Prefecture
Japanese footballers
J1 League players
J2 League players
Japan Football League players
Vegalta Sendai players
Sony Sendai FC players
Montedio Yamagata players
Goshi Okubo
Goshi Okubo
Expatriate footballers in Thailand
Japanese expatriate footballers
Japanese expatriate sportspeople in Thailand
Association football forwards
Goshi Okubo